is a Japanese professional wrestler and idol best known for her time in the Japanese promotion Tokyo Joshi Pro-Wrestling. Prior to her wrestling career, Arai was part of SKE48's team KII.

Professional wrestling career

DDT Pro-Wrestling (2018; 2021–present)
Arai made her professional wrestling debut in DDT Pro-Wrestling at DDT Live! Maji Manji #21 on October 28, 2018, where she competed in a gauntlet battle royal where she defended the Ironman Heavymetalweight Championship she won eighteen days earlier at a house show where she won it from her SKE48 group colleague Kaori Matsumura. The match was won by Maki Itoh and also involved various other opponents such as Cherry, Emi Sakura, Mizuki, Saki Akai and Yuki Kamifuku. Arai continued her professional wrestling career after a two and a half year break, mainly competing in sister-promotion Tokyo Joshi Pro-Wrestling. She made her return to DDT at Never Mind 2022 on December 29, where she teamed up with her "Reiwa Ban AA Cannon" tag team partner Saki Akai to defeat Saori Anou and Rika Kawahata.

Tokyo Joshi Pro-Wrestling (2021–present)
Arai made her first appearance in Tokyo Joshi Pro-Wrestling at TJPW Yes! Wonderland 2021 on May 4, where she teamed up with Miu Watanabe in a losing effort against Arisu Endo and Maki Itoh. During her time in the promotion, she chased after various championships promoted by it. At TJPW Tokyo Joshi 2021 Autumn on December 4, she competed in a battle royal to determine the number one contender for the International Princess Championship won by Maki Itoh and also involving Hyper Misao, Nodoka Tenma, Rika Tatsumi, Shoko Nakajima, Nao Kakuta and Suzume. At TJPW Grand Princess '22 on March 19, she unsuccessfully chllenged Itoh for the same title. She won the Princess Tag Team Championship for the first time by teaming up with Saki Akai and defeating Magical Sugar Rabbits (Mizuki and Yuka Sakazaki) at TJPW Summer Sun Princess '22 on July 9. They lost the titles at TJPW Tokyo Joshi Pro '23 on January 4 to Wasteland War Party (Heidi Howitzer and Max the Impaler).

Pro Wrestling Noah (2021)
Due to TJPW being a promotion patroned by the CyberFight company, Arai competed in cross-over events held between the three promotions owned by it, those being TJPW, DDT and Pro Wrestling Noah. The only event of such kind was the CyberFight Festival 2021 from June 6, where she teamed up with Hikari Noa and Mizuki in a losing effort against Maki Itoh, Marika Kobashi and Yuki Kamifuku. Arai is scheduled to compete at Keiji Muto Grand Final Pro-Wrestling "Last-Love" on February 21, 2023, where she will team up with Mizuki, Maki Itoh and Miu Watanabe to take on Yuka Sakazaki, Miyu Yamashita, Shoko Nakajima and Rika Tatsumi.

Championships and accomplishments
DDT Pro-Wrestling
Ironman Heavymetalweight Championship (1 time)
Tokyo Joshi Pro Wrestling
Princess Tag Team Championship (1 time) – with Saki Akai
Tokyo Sports Puroresu Awards
Rookie Of The Year (2021)

References

1998 births
Living people
Japanese female professional wrestlers
21st-century professional wrestlers
People from Kyoto Prefecture
Sportspeople from Kyoto Prefecture
Ironman Heavymetalweight Champions